Carey Faughs GAC is a Gaelic Athletic Association club located in Ballyvoy, County Antrim, Northern Ireland. The club is primarily concerned with the game of hurling.

History

Located in the village of Ballyvoy in the Glens of Antrim, Carey Faughs GAC was founded in 1903 by Dennis Maguire and Patrick Moore. The club was only three years in existence when they won the first of their three Antrim SHC titles in 1906. Carey Faughs have also claimed Antrim IHC and Antrim JHC titles and were the inaugural Ulster intermediate club hurling final-winners in 2004.

Honours

Antrim Senior Hurling Championship (3): 1906, 1916, 1923
Ulster Intermediate Club Hurling Championship (1): 2004
Antrim Intermediate Hurling Championship (3): 1990, 2002, 2021
Antrim Junior Hurling Championship (2): 1983, 1999

Notable players

 James Black: Ulster SHC-winner (2011)

References

External link

 Carey Faughs GAC website

Gaelic games clubs in County Antrim
Hurling clubs in County Antrim